Hal Hayworth Dixon (July 7, 1920 – July 28, 1966) was a professional baseball umpire who worked in the National League from 1953 to 1959. He umpired in the 1959 World Series and the 1957 Major League Baseball All-Star Game.

Umpiring career
Dixon umpired 989 major league games in his seven seasons.

In 1959, Dixon worked his only World Series. He spent all six games of the series working as the left field or right field umpire. He submitted his resignation after that season when a request for a salary increase was denied. He died from a heart attack on July 28, 1966, at age 46.

References

External links
The Sporting News umpire card

1920 births
1966 deaths
Major League Baseball umpires
Sportspeople from North Carolina